Ervin Fritz (born 27 June 1940) is a Slovene poet, playwright and translator. He also writes poetry for children, radio plays, songs and librettos. He started publishing poetry in the mid-1960s.

Fritz was born in Prebold in 1940. He studied Dramaturgy at the Academy for Theatre, Radio, Film and Television in Ljubljana and worked as dramatourge at TV Ljubljana and Radio Slovenia.

In 1979 he won the Prešeren Foundation Award for his poetry collection Okruški sveta and in 2006 he received the Veronika Award for the poetry collection Ogrlica iz rad.

Selected works

Poetry collections
 Hvalnica življenja, 1967
 Dan današnji, 1972
 Okruški sveta, 1978
 Pesmi, 1980
 Minevanje, 1982
 Dejansko stanje: Pesmi in songi, 1985
 Slehernik, 1987
 Črna skrinjica, 1991
 Pravzaprav pesmi, 1995
 Favn:Pesmičice kosmatičice, 1998
 Tja čez:Soneti, 2002
 Pesmi: Zgodnja, zrela in pozna trgatev: jagodni izbor, 2002
 Ogrlica iz rad, 2005
 Drugačen svet, 2008
 Dolgi pohod, 2010

Poetry collections for children
 Dimnikar je črn grof, 1984
 Svet v naprstniku, 1992
 Mavrica Mavra, 1993
 Števila, 1993
 Nasprotja, 1993
 Moj dan, 1993
 Barve, 1994
 Liki, 1994
 Vrane, 2007

Prose for children
 Devet zgodb in deseta desetnica, 1996
 Sreča in nesreča, 2010

Plays
 Farse, 1973
 Mirakel o sveti Neži, 1977
 Kralj Malhus, 1988
 Lipicanija, 2000
 Rdeči kotiček, 2009
 Srčevje svetega Andreja, 2009
 Krpanova kobila, opera libretto 2010

Radio plays
 Komisija za samomore, 1984
 Stoli, 1984
 Kralj Malhus, 1986
 Karantena, 1988
 Ta veseli dan ali Cefizelj se ženi, 1990
 Zmaj v Postojnski jami, 1990
 Mirakel o sveti Neži, 1991
 Krompir ali Kregarca in ljudska oblast, 1993

Radio plays for children
 Zajček Peter, 1985
 Sin polka, 1986
 Grofič prašič, 1991
 Gorski škrat, 1991
 Črna baba in povodni mož, 1991
 Modra Barbica, 1992
 Legenda o Jezusu in svetem Petru, 1992
 Papagaj kralja Matjaža, 1994

References

Slovenian poets
Slovenian male poets
Slovenian dramatists and playwrights
Slovenian translators
Living people
1940 births
Veronika Award laureates
University of Ljubljana alumni
People from the Municipality of Prebold